FC Rodina Moscow is a Russian football team based in Moscow that will play in the second-tier Russian First League in the 2022–23 season.

History
It was founded in 2019 as a senior squad of a pre-existing youth academy. For 2019–20 season, it received the license for the third-tier Russian Professional Football League. 

The club finished 4th in the 2021 Korantina Homes Cup International football tournament in Pafos, Cyprus, having been runners up in 2019. 

On 30 May 2022, Rodina secured promotion to FNL.

Current squad
As of 22 February 2023, according to the First League website.

Out on loan

Reserve teams

Honours
 Russian Football National League 2 (1): 2021-22

References

External links
  Official site 

Association football clubs established in 2015
Football clubs in Russia
Football clubs in Moscow
2015 establishments in Russia